The Hussite Theological Faculty (Czech: Husitská teologická fakulta) is one of three theological faculties of Charles University in Prague. The Faculty was founded with the Czechoslovak Hussite Church which was established at the beginning of 1920 from the Catholic Modernist movement. The Hussite Theological Faculty currently offers theological studies of three Christian convictions - Hussite Theology, Old Catholic Theology and Orthodox Theology.

History 
The first dean of the Faculty was Gustav Adolf Skalský (1857–1926).

Departments 

 Department of Systematical Theology, Theological Ethics and Theological Philosophy 
 Department of Biblical and Jewish Studies 
 Department of Practical Theology, Ecumenical Studies and Interpersonal Communication 
 Department of Historical Theology and Church History 
 Department of Philosophy 
 Department of Religious Studies 
 Department of Pedagogy 
 Department of Psychosocial Sciences and Ethics 
 Institute of Eastern Christianity

References 

Charles University
Educational institutions established in 1921
1921 establishments in Czechoslovakia